Central Television may refer to:

Central Digital Television, television stations in Australia
Central GTS/BKN, television stations in Australia
Central Luzon Television, television station in the Philippines
China Central Television, state television station of China
Fukushima Central Television, television stations in Japan
ITV Central, formerly known as Central Independent Television, commercial television region and station in the United Kingdom
Korean Central Television, state television station of the North Korea
Soviet Central Television, state television of Soviet Union

See also
Central (TV channel), a Singaporean television channel